Printable (noun: printability) usually refers to something suitable for printing:
 Printable character
 Printable version
 Printability of paper, see paper and ink testing

See also 
 Quoted-printable